John C. Oakley (January 11, 1946 – April 17, 2006) was an American neurosurgeon.  He was a pioneer in advancing spinal cord stimulator for the treatment of intractable pain.

References 

1946 births
2006 deaths
American neurosurgeons
20th-century surgeons